Tilden may refer to:

Places 
Canada
 Tilden Lake, Ontario

United States
 Fort Tilden, former U.S. Army installation in the New York City borough of Queens
 Tilden, Illinois
 Tilden, Indiana
 Tilden, Missouri
 Tilden, Nebraska
 Tilden, Texas
 Tilden, West Virginia
 Tilden, Wisconsin, a town
 Tilden (community), Wisconsin, an unincorporated community
 Tilden Regional Park, Berkeley, California

Other uses 
 Tilden (surname), including a list of people with the surname
 Tilden Middle School, in the Montgomery County Public Schools, Rockville, Maryland
 Tilden Rent-a-Car, Canadian car rental company

See also 
 Tilden Township (disambiguation)
 Tylden (disambiguation)